Honeycomb Ridge is a ridge which extends north from the mouth of Ironside Glacier on the west side of Moubray Bay, Antarctica. It was so named by the New Zealand Geological Survey Antarctic Expedition, 1957–58, because it consists mainly of a granitic rock which in many places is honeycombed on exposed surfaces by holes and cavities.

The east side is indented by Copper Cove.

References

Ridges of Victoria Land
Borchgrevink Coast